Saint-Christophe-de-Valains is a commune in the Ille-et-Vilaine department in Brittany in northwestern France.

Saint-Christophe-de-Valains comes from Saint Christopher, patron saint of travelers and Valains, fief of Vieux-Vy-sur-Couesnon.

Population

Geography

The neighboring communes are Chauvigné, Le Tiercent, Saint-Ouen-des-Alleux, and Vieux-Vy-sur-Couesnon.

Sights
Parish Church of the 15th century.
Castle of La Bélinaye 17th century.
Liberty Oak in La Basse-Haye.
Valley of "La Minette".

Events
Ball every 14 July under the Liberty Oak.

See also
Communes of the Ille-et-Vilaine department

References

External links

Official website : Saint-Christophe-de-Valains 
 Geography of Brittany
 The page of the commune on infobretagne.com

Communes of Ille-et-Vilaine